Susan Bordo is an American philosopher known for her contributions in the field of contemporary cultural studies, particularly in the area of "body studies".

Overview
Bordo's writing contributes to a body of feminist, cultural and gender studies, linking modern consumer culture directly to the formation of gendered bodies. She is known for her Unbearable Weight: Feminism, Western Culture, and the Body (1993), a text that looks at the impact of popular culture (television, advertisements, and magazines, for example) in shaping the female body while also looking at typical female disorders such as hysteria, agoraphobia, anorexia nervosa and bulimia as "complex crystallizations of culture". Bordo has also garnered attention for her more recent The Male Body: A New Look at Men in Public and Private (1999), a text which Bordo describes as being "a personal/cultural exploration of the male body from a woman's point of view."

Education and professional career
Raised in Newark, New Jersey, Bordo graduated in 1964 from Weequahic High School. She received her Ph.D. from the State University of New York at Stony Brook in 1982. She currently holds the Otis A. Singletary Chair in the Humanities at the University of Kentucky where she teaches English and Women's studies. Bordo specializes in contemporary culture and its relation to the body, focusing on modern female disorders such as anorexia and bulimia, cosmetic surgery, beauty and evolutionary theory. She also deals with racism and the body, issues of masculinity along with issues of sexual harassment.

Theoretical context

Philosophical discourse
While Bordo's writing works to "reach outside the academic world", her theoretical prose and frank critiques of modern culture in relation to subject, gender and body formations are nonetheless grounded in theoretical frameworks. Bordo's work reflects a background in philosophical discourse in which issues of rationality, objectivity and Cartesian dualism are taken up, explored and used to situate the body within culture historically. Bordo claims that "[w]hat remains the constant element throughout historical variation is the construction of body as something apart from the true self (whether conceived as soul, mind, spirit, will, creativity, freedom . . .) and as undermining the best efforts of that self". She traces the "body" as a concept and as a material "thing" back to Plato, Augustine and the Bible revealing how traditionally the body has been viewed as "animal, as appetite, as deceiver, as prisoner of the soul and confounder of its projects". She also traces the dualistic nature of the mind/body connection by examining the early philosophies of Aristotle, Hegel and Descartes, revealing how such distinguishing binaries such as spirit/matter and male activity/female passivity have worked to solidify gender characteristics and categorization. Bordo proceeds to point out that while men have historically been associated with the intellect and the mind or spirit, women have long been associated with the body, the subordinated, negatively imbued term in the mind/body dichotomy.

Materialism
Bordo argues that "knowledge is 'embodied,' produced from a 'standpoint,' by a body that is located as a material entity among other material entities". She is therefore situated within a materialist framework, for, as Susan Hekman points out, "Bordo's emphasis on the materiality of the body, what most of us would call the 'real' body, is a function of her central theoretical conviction". Situating Bordo within a feminist and materialist theoretical context, her work is often compared and contrasted with Judith Butler's writing, writing that deals with gender formation and the body. Hekman provides analyses of Bordo's situatedness within materialist discourse and suggests both differences and similarities in the theoretical concerns of Bordo and Butler. While Bordo does at times imply that the body is a text to be inscribed upon and interpreted, she also emphasizes the materiality and locatedness of bodies within Western culture, whereas Butler's work on the body reflects a greater affiliation with postmodern thought in "treat[ing] the body as pure text". Bordo questions such a purely textual body for "If the body is treated as pure text, subversive, destabilizing elements can be emphasized and freedom and self-determination celebrated; but one is left wondering, is there a body in this text?". For Bordo, it is the "cultural definitions of the body and its materiality as they are given to us" that must be resisted, and therefore "real" bodies "must be the focus of feminist analysis and, significantly, feminist resistance".

Feminism
Bordo's critique of gendered, and particularly feminine, bodies stems from both feminist and gender studies methodologies. She critiques, re-evaluates, and reconfigures old and new feminist methodology, not excluding certain earlier feminist concerns that focused on the dichotomies of oppressor/oppressed, victimizer/victim, but re-evaluating their effectiveness and application to contemporary feminine concerns. As Bordo points out, feminism of the late 1960s and 1970s viewed "the female body [as] a socially shaped and historically 'colonized' territory". Such a view, she claims, classifies women and the female body predominantly as victims, living passively/submissively within patriarchal society, a tabula rasa awaiting inscription. Intending to go beyond such a classification, Bordo writes that new feminist critiques looked more towards "racial, economic and class differences among women," while also looking at "both women's collusions with patriarchal culture and their frequent efforts at resistance".

Cultural studies
While situated within feminist and gender studies frameworks, Bordo's theories also stem from a cultural studies approach where the power of cultural phenomena such as television, advertising and popular magazines are analyzed in terms of means of domination and of resistance. While certain cultural theorists, for example John Fiske, who wrote Television Culture (1990), see elements of culture like television as "demonstrating the way representational codes and techniques shape our perception" but also as a means for resistance, where audience members could "decode" such messages and thus be able to "think resistantly about their lives", Bordo sees cultural coding as a more pernicious, binding and overwhelming force. For Bordo "the rules of femininity have come to be culturally transmitted more and more through the deployment of standardized visual images"; cultural transmitters such as television and print media work insidiously to "impose models of bodily beauty that get construed as freely chosen options by those victimized by them".

Post structuralism
The notions of culture, power and gender/subject formation that dominate Bordo's writing arise in some degree from poststructuralist thought. Susan Hekman points out that "[l]ike an increasing number of contemporary feminist theorists [Bordo] argues for a selective use of postmodern theories" and one way Bordo's work can be seen in a poststructuralist/postmodernist light is through her usage of Foucauldian methodology. Bordo appropriates the ideas of Michel Foucault in critiquing, analyzing and bringing to light "the normative feminine practices of our culture". As Bordo points out, Foucault saw power not "as the possession of individuals or groups" but "as a dynamic or network of non-centralized forces", and such a depiction of power relations is therefore useful in a critique of gender formation/regulation. If, in a Foucauldian sense, power works from below, then "prevailing forms of selfhood and subjectivity (gender among them) are maintained, not chiefly through physical restraint and coercion (although social relations may certainly contain such elements), but through individual self-surveillance and self-correction to norms". Foucault's theories of power and discipline along with theories on sexuality serve contemporary feminist aims in revealing how cultural normative practices, expressed through popular media, work to influence femininity (and gendered bodies in general) into homogeneity while at the same time seeming freely chosen. "Like Foucault, [Bordo] focuses on the discourses through which society produces, understands, defines, and interprets the female body."

Writing

The Flight to Objectivity: Essays on Cartesianism and Culture (1987)
The Flight to Objectivity represents what Bordo refers to as a "fresh approach" to Descartes' Meditations. She critiques the stable notion of objectivity and knowledge inherent in Cartesian thought, notions that, in our contemporary society, have become critically distanced, for "[t]he limitations of science and the interested, even ideological nature of all human pursuits now seem unavoidable recognitions". Bordo suggests that rather than viewing Descartes from a "coherent abstract or ahistorical" perspective, we need to approach Descartes' philosophical arguments within "the context of the cultural pressures that gave rise to them". Susan Hekman notes that Bordo's The Flight to Objectivity, while not overtly dealing with theorizations of the body, does point to the fact that "the origin of our culture's text for the body, and particularly the female body, is the work of Descartes". The Cartesian division of the mind and the body, where the body is the "prison that the mind must escape to achieve knowledge", guides Bordo's further analyses of culturally influenced bodies and the shaping of the female body in particular.

Unbearable Weight: Feminism, Western Culture, and the Body (1993)
Bordo's Unbearable Weight presents a collection of essays that focus on the body's situatedness and construction in Western Society and offers "a cultural approach to the body". Bordo looks at "obsessive body practices of contemporary culture" and claims that her aim "is not to portray these obsessions as bizarre or anomalous, but, rather, as the logical (if extreme) manifestations of anxieties and fantasies fostered by our culture". Practices such as cosmetic surgery, obsessive dieting and physical training represent, for Bordo, how cultural "representations homogenize" and how "these homogenized images normalize". Unbearable Weight also traces the connection between culture and female disorders and Bordo emphasizes the fact that disorders such as anorexia nervosa and bulimia cannot simply be defined from medical and psychological standpoints but must be viewed from within a cultural context, as "complex crystallizations of culture". It is through such female disorders that resistance to dominant ideological constructs are seemingly played out; however, such a resistance reveals the devastating effects of culture on the contemporary female body. In 2003, the tenth anniversary reissue edition of Unbearable Weight was nominated for a Pulitzer Prize after its original release date. In the reissue of the book, Bordo considers the cultural images of the female body within the framework of the patriarchy, contemporary feminism, and postindustrial capitalism.

Twilight Zones: The Hidden Life of Cultural Images from Plato to O.J. (1997)
Twilight Zones represents Bordo's continued preoccupation and study of cultural images and their saturation within contemporary culture. She utilizes Plato's parable of the cave, where images are projected onto the back of the cave presenting the illusion of a reality its inhabitants identify with and accept as real, claiming that such a metaphor depicts a particular contemporary concern. She writes that "[f]or us, bedazzlement by created images is no metaphor; it is the actual condition of our lives". Bordo alludes to constructed images of bodily perfection in contemporary consumer culture such as the portrayal of reconstructed physical bodies in magazines and advertisements as presenting false ideals for the viewers who identify with such images and use them as standards for their own bodies and lives. She writes that "we need to rehabilitate the concept of "truth" for our time . . . focusing on helping the next generation learn to critically see through the illusions and mystifications of the image dominated culture they have grown up in". Twilight Zones also takes up, in various essays, the connection and conversation between academic and non-academic institutions, for while not anti-academic herself, Bordo sees academic and intellectual thought as proclaiming itself "'outside' the cave of cultural mystification," as raised up onto "a loftier perch, scrutinizing the proceedings below". Bordo wants to "bring theory down to earth".

The Male Body: A New Look at Men in Public and in Private (1999)
With The Male Body Bordo shifts her focus from looking specifically at female and feminized bodies to looking at the male body from a female perspective. She includes analyses of the male body that take into consideration the representation of the male body in popular cultural modes of communication such as movies, advertisements and literature, revealing how anxieties over bodily form and beauty are not limited to women but are of concern for men also. She also analyzes attitudes surrounding the penis and gay culture in the twentieth century.

The Creation of Anne Boleyn (2014) 
In The Creation of Anne Boleyn, Bordo seeks to break down the "sedimented mythology turned into 'history' by decades of repetition" and rewrite Boleyn's story as an ambitious woman seeking power without the cache of distorted imagery around her appearance.

The Destruction of Hillary Clinton (2017)
Bordo examines why "… the most qualified candidate ever to run for president lost the seemingly unloseable election."

Bibliography
Bordo, Susan. "The Body and the Reproduction of Femininity: A Feminist Appropriation of Foucault." Gender/Body/Knowledge: Feminist Reconstructions of Being and Knowing. Eds. Alison M. Jaggar and Susan R. Bordo. New Brunswick: Rutgers UP, 1989. 13-33.
Bordo, Susan. The Flight to Objectivity: Essays on Cartesianism and Culture. Albany: State U of New York P, 1987.
Bordo, Susan. The Male Body: A Look at Men in Public and in Private. New York: Farrar, Straus and Giroux, 1999.
Bordo, Susan. Twilight Zones: The Hidden Life of Cultural Images from Plato to O.J. Berkeley: U of California P, 1997.
Bordo, Susan. Unbearable Weight: Feminism, Western Culture, and the Body. Berkeley: U of California P, 1993.
Bordo, Susan, ed. Feminist Interpretations of René Descartes. University Park, PA: Pennsylvania State UP, 1999.
Hekman, Susan. Review of Unbearable Weight, by Susan Bordo, and Bodies That Matter, by Judith Butler. Hypatia 10.4 (Fall 1995).
Hekman, Susan. "Material Bodies." Body and Flesh: A Philosophical Reader. Ed. Donn Welton. Malden, MA: Blackwell, 1998. 61-70.
Jarvis, Christina. "Gendered Appetites: Feminisms, Dorothy Allison, and the Body." Women's Studies 29.6 (Dec. 2000). 763-92.
Rooney, Ellen. "What Can the Matter Be?" American Literary History 8.4 (Winter 1996). 745-58.
"Susan Bordo." The Norton Anthology of Theory and Criticism. Vincent B. Leitch, gen. ed. New York: Norton and Co., 2001. 2360-62
Bordo, Susan The Creation of Anne Boleyn, A New Look at England's Most Notorious Queen. HMH 2013
Bordo, Susan. The Destruction of Hillary Clinton.  Melville House (April 4, 2017).

See also
American philosophy
Body culture studies
List of American philosophers

References

External links
Faculty page at the University of Kentucky

20th-century American philosophers
Feminist studies scholars
Living people
Postmodern feminists
Jewish feminists
Jewish American academics
Jewish philosophers
American women philosophers
Year of birth missing (living people)
People from Newark, New Jersey
Weequahic High School alumni
20th-century American women
American feminist writers
21st-century American Jews
21st-century American women